Lady of the House may refer to:

 Sitt al-Bayt or Lady of the House, a 1949 Egyptian film
 Bariwali (The Lady of the House), a 2000 Bengali film
 The Lady of the House, original name of the Irish Tatler founded in 1890, see Tatler
 Lady of the House, a 1966 autobiography by Sally Stanford
 Lady of the House, a 1978 television movie directed by Ralph Nelson and starring Dyan Cannon, based on the autobiography by Sally Stanford
Lady of the House, a Detroit, MI restaurant owned by Kate Williams (chef)

See also 
 Mistress (form of address), an old form of address that implies "lady of the house"